Josefa Vuniyayawa Levula (15 June 1930 – 2 July 1989), known as "Jo" or "Joe", was a Fijian track athlete, and rugby union and professional rugby league footballer. He represented the Fijian national rugby union team before turning professional with the Rochdale Hornets and Bradford Northern in England. He primarily played on the wing.

Levula earned the nickname "The Flying Fijian", which went on to become the nickname of the Fiji national rugby union team.

Career

Rugby union
Levula, who had an unorthodox high knee action and his exceptionally long strides represented Fiji in the 1960s. In 1951, over 3000 fans came to Buckhurst Park to see the final between Suva and the Northern District. Levula scored four tries to end Suva’s 10 year hold on the trophy.

He was selected in the Fiji to tour New Zealand. He made his début for Fiji at fly-half and he scored a brace of tries against the Māori All Blacks to beat them 21–14 for which he received a New Zealand Rugby honour of being nominated as ‘Player of the Year'. In August 1952, he was on the wing for Fiji when they created history by beating Australia.

Athletics
He joined the Athletics Fiji team in 1954 to take part in the Australian Athletics Championships. He finished 2nd in the 100-yard dash behind Hector Hogan.

Rugby league
In 1961, he defied the FRU when he left rugby union and went to England to join the Rochdale Hornets rugby league team with fellow Fijian Orisi Dawai, and later joined by Fijians Voate Drui and Laitia Ravouvou. Levula transferred to Bradford Northern in 1964.

He was inducted into the Fiji Sports Hall of Fame in 1990.

References

External links

1930 births
1989 deaths
Bradford Bulls players
Expatriate rugby league players in England
Fijian male sprinters
Fijian rugby league players
Fijian rugby union players
Fiji international rugby union players
Fijian expatriate sportspeople in England
Fijian expatriate rugby league players
I-Taukei Fijian people
Sportspeople from Nadi
Rochdale Hornets players
Rugby union fly-halves
Rugby union wings